"Used to the Pain" is a song co-written and originally recorded by American country music singer Mark Nesler. Nesler wrote the song with Tony Martin, and recorded the song for his debut album I'm Just That Way (1998).

It was also recorded by American country music artist Tracy Lawrence, whose version was released in July 2005 as the first single from his compilation album Then & Now: The Hits Collection. The song reached No. 35 on the Billboard Hot Country Songs chart.

Chart performance
Mark Nesler

Tracy Lawrence

References

1998 songs
1998 debut singles
2005 singles
Tracy Lawrence songs
Songs written by Tony Martin (songwriter)
Songs written by Mark Nesler
Song recordings produced by James Stroud
Mercury Records singles
Song recordings produced by Kyle Lehning
Song recordings produced by Jerry Crutchfield
Asylum Records singles